Rongbong Terang is a literary figure from Assam, India. He is a Padmashree Awardee for his literary work Rongmilir Hanhi (1981).

Rongbong Terang worked as an Assamese teacher in Diphu Govt. Boy High School. Then as an Assamese lecturer in Diphu Govt. College and acted as Principal-in-charge on 1 April 2000 and retired on 30 November 2002. He was also the president of Asam Sahitya Sabha for two terms.

Terang was given Lifetime Achievement award at Pratidin Achiever Award 2021, Lummer Dai Award in 2019, he is conferred with Honorary DLitt from Cotton University in May 2022.

Education
He studied in Lanka High School. He was in the first batch to pass out of the school. After that he completed his graduation from Nowgong College in Assamese as his honours. In 1966, he completed his post graduation from Gauhati University.

Selected works
Rongmilir Hahi (1981)
Srimad Bhagawad Gita (1986)
Samanway Prabah (1989)
Faringor Geet (1990)
Smritir Papori (1998)
Neela Orchid (2001)
Krantikalar Ashru (2005)
Jak Herowa Pakhi (2005)
Langsoliator Kukrung (2007)

Awards
Asam Sahitya Sabha's Bishnu Rabha (1982)
Asom Prakashan Parishad (1983)
Padma Shri (1989)
Assam Valley Literary Award (2008)
Asam Sahitya Sabha's Basudev Jalan award (2008)
Mahapurush Madhavdev (2008)

References

Rongbong Terang Blog

1937 births
Living people
Recipients of the Assam Valley Literary Award
Poets from Assam
Asom Sahitya Sabha Presidents
Recipients of the Padma Shri in literature & education
People from Karbi Anglong district
20th-century Indian poets
Novelists from Assam
20th-century Indian novelists